Javanese Latin alphabet is Latin script used for writing the Javanese language. Prior to the introduction of Latin script, Javanese was written in Javanese script (hanacaraka) or Arabic-based Pegon script.

The Latin script was introduced during Dutch colonial period which exhibited the influence of Dutch orthography. Since the introduction of Latin script, the Javanese orthography in Latin script has been undergo several orthographic reforms. 

The alphabet is generally the same as the Indonesian alphabet. There are six digraphs: dh, kh, ng, ny, sy, and th, and two letters with diacritics: é and ě.

Alphabet

Sound and Spelling Correlation

Relation with Javanese script 
 (h)a - ꦲ or ꦄ (A)
 b(a) - ꦧ
 c(a) - ꦕ
 d(a) - ꦢ
 dh(a) - ꦝ
 é and è - ꦲꦺ or ꦌ (É/È)
 (h)e - ꦲꦼ
 f(a) - foreign letter ꦥ꦳
 g(a) - ꦒ
 h(a) - ꦲ
 (h)i - ꦲꦶ or ꦆ (I)
 j(a) - ꦗ
 k(a) - ꦏ
 l(a) - ꦭ
 m(a) - ꦩ
 n(a) - ꦤ
 ny(a) - ꦚ
 ng(a) - ꦔ
 (h)o - ꦲꦺꦴ or ꦎ (O)
 p(a) - ꦥ
 q(a) - Sasak letter ꦐ
 r(a) - ꦫ
 s(a) - ꦱ
 t(a) - ꦠ
 th(a) - ꦛ
 (h)u - ꦲꦸ or ꦈ (U)
 v(a) - foreign letter ꦮ꦳
 w(a) - ꦮ
 x(a) - Approximated by ꦏ꧀ꦱ
 y(a) - ꦪ
 z(a) - foreign letter ꦗ꦳

See also 
 Javanese script
 Malay orthography

Reference 
  Pedoman Bahasa Jawa yang Disempurnakan (1977)

Latin alphabets
Javanese language